Rheinfeld is a hamlet in Coulee Rural Municipality No. 136, Saskatchewan, Canada. The hamlet is located on Highway 628 9 km north of Highway 363, about 15 km south of Swift Current.

Demographics

Population unknown..

In 2006, Rheinfeld had a population of 9 living in 4 dwellings, a 25% decrease from 2015.

See also

 List of communities in Saskatchewan
 Hamlets of Saskatchewan

References

Unincorporated communities in Saskatchewan
Coulee No. 136, Saskatchewan